Ronald Graham (17 December 1926 – 2 April 2020) was a British-Australian character actor who appeared in many theatre and television roles from 1956 until retiring in 2003. He is best known for his roles in telemovies and guest roles in serials including those of Crawford Productions  and roles in popular serials Certain Women, A Country Practice and Home and Away.  He was a regular in the short lived police-oriented soap opera Waterloo Station (1983) and featured in the film Gallipoli.

Personal life
Ron Graham was born Lionel Alfred Hosmer, the second son of 3 boys to William Alfred Hosmer 1896-1953 and Doris Agatha (nee Green) 1897-1978. In 1928, the family moved to Vancouver, British Columbia, Canada. Lionel joined the British Army and in July 1948, his parents and two brothers emigrated to Australia from the United Kingdom. Lionel demobbed from the Army in 1949 and then migrated to Australia, settling in Perth.  He changed his name by deed poll to Ron Graham. He first married in the early 1960s to Judith Schonell, a dancer with the West Australian State Ballet. He was the father of Australian stage, television and film actor and director Marcus Graham. Ron later partnered with Aleda Klara Johnsen. He died in Windsor, New South Wales on 2 April 2020 at the age of 93.

Filmography (television and film)

References

External links 
 

1926 births
2020 deaths
Australian male television actors
Australian male film actors
English male film actors
English male television actors
English emigrants to Australia
20th-century Australian male actors
21st-century Australian male actors
20th-century English male actors
21st-century English male actors